Sándor Mazány (16 March 1923 – 20 October 2012) was a Hungarian alpine skier. He competed in the men's downhill at the 1948 Winter Olympics.

References

1923 births
2012 deaths
Hungarian male alpine skiers
Olympic alpine skiers of Hungary
Alpine skiers at the 1948 Winter Olympics
Skiers from Budapest
20th-century Hungarian people